They Used to Play on Grass is a 1972 novel by former English footballer Terry Venables and Scottish author Gordon Williams. The novel predicted the end of grass as a playing surface, and that plastic pitches would become the norm in football. In 2003 the book was listed on the BBC's The Big Read poll of the UK's "best-loved novel".

References

1972 British novels
Novels about association football
British sports novels
Hodder & Stoughton books